The 1946 Minnesota lieutenant gubernatorial election took place on November 5, 1946. Incumbent Lieutenant Governor C. Elmer Anderson of the Republican Party of Minnesota defeated Minnesota Democratic-Farmer-Labor Party challenger Frank McGinn.

Results

External links
 Election Returns

Lieutenant Gubernatorial
1946

Minnesota